John Sylvester Ross (July 16, 1821 – July 1, 1882) was a miller and political figure in Ontario. He was a Liberal-Conservative member of the House of Commons of Canada who represented Dundas from 1867 to 1872 and from 1879 to 1882.

He was born in Osnabruck Township Upper Canada in 1821, the son of Michael Ross, and settled in the village of Iroquois where he set up a general store. He married Charlotte Carman, the granddaughter of Peter Shaver, in 1845. Ross served on the council for Matilda Township and was reeve in 1856. In 1861, he was elected to the Legislative Assembly of the Province of Canada representing Dundas; he was reelected in 1863. He was president of the Iroquois Milling Company. Ross was also secretary-treasurer and president for the High School Board. He died in Iroquois at the age of 61.

His son Hugo also represented Dundas in the House of Commons.

References 

1821 births
1882 deaths
Members of the House of Commons of Canada from Ontario
Conservative Party of Canada (1867–1942) MPs
Members of the Legislative Assembly of the Province of Canada from Canada West